Kord Gavar (also Romanized as Kord Gāvar; also known as Kord Gavābar) is a village in Layl Rural District, in the Central District of Lahijan County, Gilan Province, Iran. At the 2006 census, its population was 150, in 44 families.

References 

Populated places in Lahijan County